Thale Ban National Park is a forested area south of the Banthat Mountains in southern Thailand, in the south of Satun Province bordering Malaysia; it borders Taman Negeri Perlis park. The park was established on 27 October 1980. It covers an area of 122,500 rai ~   of Khuan Don and Mueang Satun districts.

Geography 
The park is located around a valley which formed the historic link between Thailand and Malaysia. According to local lore, 300 years ago an earthquake formed the lake in the valley, probably due to a landslide which created a natural dam. Submerged trees found in the lake seem to confirm this story.

The limestone hills contain several caves. Tham Ton Din is a river cave near park headquarters.

Flora and fauna 
The park features forest types including tropical rain forest, mixed deciduous forest and coastal mangrove forests. The rain forest is home to species of Dipterocarpus, Hopea, Shorea, Parashorea, Alstonia, Caryota and Calamus. The deciduous forest, unusual in southern Thailand, has species of Caryota, Lagerstroemia, Pterocymbium, Vitex, Schima and Dillenia. The coastal forest is home to mangrove species such as Rhizophora mucronata, R. apiculata, Bruguiera cylindrica and species of Avicennia.

The park is known to contain 64 mammal species, 282 bird species (including 8 hornbill species), 40 reptile species and 20 amphibian species.

Mammals include the endangered Malayan tapir, threatened Sumatran serow and protected marbled cat. Other mammals include tiger, leopard cat and sun bear. Birds in the park include chestnut-bellied malkoha, orange-breasted trogon, Gould's frogmouth, blue-winged pitta, blue-crowned hanging parrot, white-crowned hornbill, oriental pied hornbill, brown boobook, black-and-red broadbill, Asian green broadbill, banded broadbill and hill myna. Reptiles include the common house gecko, large forest gecko, reticulated python, king cobra, soft-shelled turtle and the endangered sunburst turtle.

See also
List of national parks of Thailand
List of Protected Areas Regional Offices of Thailand

References

External links 
thaibirding.com on Thalebun national park

National parks of Thailand
Protected areas established in 1980
Geography of Satun province
Tourist attractions in Satun province
1980 establishments in Thailand